Maharashtra University of Health Sciences (MUHS) is a higher education institution in Nashik, Maharashtra, India.

History
The university was established on 3 June 1998 by the state [Government of Maharashtra] through an ordinance. The State Legislature passed the ordinance and the Maharashtra University of Health Sciences was declared open by the governor of Maharashtra on June 10, 1998. All colleges and institutions imparting education in health science in the state of Maharashtra have been affiliated to this new university under Section 6(3) of the Act.

Academics

Postgraduate courses awarded are versatile including Doctor of Medicine (M.D.) in various areas, Master of Surgery (M.S.), as well as Master of Science (M.Sc.) courses and other PG diplomas.

Affiliated medical colleges

Bachelor of Medicine Bachelor of Surgery (MBBS) 
Medical colleges affiliated with the university, :

Government Medical College, Gondia
Grant Medical College, Mumbai
Armed Forces Medical College, Pune
ACPM Medical College, Dhule
B J Medical College, Pune
Ashwini rural medical college and hospital, Solapur
Dr. Shankarrao Chavan Government Medical College, Nanded
Dr. V. M. Government Medical College, Solapur
Dr. Ulhas Patil Medical College and Hospital, Jalgaon
Cooper Hospital and H.B.T. Medical College, Juhu
Dr. Panjabrao Deshmukh Memorial Medical College, Amravati
Grant Medical College, Mumbai
Government Medical College, Akola
Government Medical College, Aurangabad
Government Medical College, Baramati
Government Medical College, Chandrapur
Government Medical College, Jalgaon
Government Medical College, Latur District
Government Medical college, Nagpur
Government Medical College, Miraj, Sangli
Indira Gandhi Government Medical College, Nagpur
Seth Gordhandas Sunderdas Medical College, Mumbai
K J Somaiya medical college, Chunabhatti, Sion, Mumbai
Lokmanya Tilak Municipal Medical College and General Hospital, Sion, Mumbai
MIMER Medical College, Talegaon Dabhade
Maharashtra Institute of Medical Science and Research, Latur, Latur
Mahatma Gandhi Institute of Medical Sciences, Sevagram, Wardha
Dr. Vasantrao Pawar Medical College Hospital and Research Center, Nashik
S.M.B.T Institute Of Medical Science And Research Centre, Igatpuri, Nashik
N.K.P. Salve Institute of Medical Sciences, Nagpur
DVVP’s Medical College, A’nagar
Rajiv Gandhi Medical College, Kalwa, Thane
Jawaharlal Nehru Medical College, Wardha
R.C.S.M. Govt Medical College and CPR Hospital, Kolhapur
Shri Bhausaheb Hire Government Medical College, Dhule
Shri Vasantrao Naik Government Medical College, Yavatmal
Smt. Kashibai Navale Medical College, Pune
Swami Ramanand Teerth Rural Medical College, Ambejogai, Beed
Terna Medical College, Navi Mumbai
Topiwala National Medical College, Mumbai
B.K.L. Walawalkar Rural Medical College, Sawarde, Ratnagiri
Prakash Institute of Medical Sciences and Research, Urun-Islampur, Sangli
Vedantaa Institute Of Medical Sciences, Dahanu
IIMSR, Warudi Taluka- Badnapur District, Jalna

References

External links
Maharashtra University of Health Sciences
Maharashtra-DMER

 
Medical and health sciences universities in India
Medical colleges in Maharashtra
Education in Nashik district
Educational institutions established in 1998
1998 establishments in Maharashtra
Public medical universities
Universities in Maharashtra